BGZ may refer to:

 Braga Airport, Portugal (by IATA code)
 Banggai language (by ISO 639 code)
 Bank BGŻ BNP Paribas, (bank), Poland
 BGŻ Arena, a velodrome in Pruszków, Poland